Um Al-Sahek(Arabic:ام الساهك) is a small town in the Eastern Province of Saudi Arabia located 10 kilometers southwest of Ras Tanura.

Populated places in Eastern Province, Saudi Arabia